Posadigumpe is a monolith hillock in  Manjeshwaram taluk of Kasargod district of Kerala state, south India at an altitude of 1060ft

Tourism
Posadigumpe is a picnic spot and tourist resort located on a hillock 487.68 metres above sea level near Bayar village, 30 km north-east of Kasaragod. From the hill top one can see the Arabian Sea, Mangalore and Kudremukh.
The place is accessible from NH 17 via Bandyodu or Uppala.

Languages
This locality is an essentially multi-lingual region. Tulu is the main language here. The people here also speak Malayalam, Urdu and Kannada languages.

Administration
This village is part of Manjeswaram assembly constituency which is again part of Kasaragod (Lok Sabha constituency)

Transportation
Local roads have access to National Highway No.66 which connects to Mangalore in the north and Calicut in the south.  The nearest railway station is Kumbla which is 23km away on Mangalore-Palakkad line. There is an airport at Mangalore.

References

Manjeshwar area
Hills of Kerala